Seo Kyoung-Duk (Korean:서경덕; Hanja:徐坰德, born 25 May 1974) is a South Korean nationalist scholar and social activist. Seo is a counselor at the Presidential Council on Nation Branding. Seo is a professor in Sungshin University and the creator of ‘Dokdo School’ (Korean:독도학교; Hanja:獨島學校), an educational institution with a strong patriotic orientation. Professor Seo criticizes Japan on comfort women and Liancourt Rocks disputes  and actively involves in Sino-Korean cultural disputes.

References

1974 births
Living people
Anti-Japanese sentiment in South Korea
South Korean scholars
South Korean activists
Korea University alumni
Korean nationalists